A grievance is a legal wrong or hardship.

Grievance or Grievances may also refer to:
Grievance (labour), a formal complaint in the workplace
Grievance (song), on the album Binaural by Pearl Jam (2000)
Grievance (novel), by K. C. Constantine (2000)
Grievance Blues, a song by Lightnin' Hopkins (1960)
Grievances (album), by Rolo Tomassi (2015)
Grievances, a novel by Mark Ethridge (2006)

See also 
Complaint (disambiguation)
Grievance redressal, a process for handling complaints commonly used in India
Greed versus grievance in political science